Dana International – The Album is a compilation album of recordings by Israeli singer Dana International, released in 1998.

This is basically a compilation album of early recordings by Dana International with a few new tracks for international release. The Album was not backed by either Dana International herself or her management - in fact, they actively asked fans not to buy it. Dana took the Helicon label to court over the rights to her back catalogue and won in September 1998.

The album was released in August 1998 by Helicon/Big Foot/PolyGram (catalogue number 559 147–2) and in September that same year on the Star Records label (STARCD 6427).

Certain tracks on this album seem to have undergone a light remix, emphasising instruments differently for example. By listening carefully, it may be noticed that especially the songs "Arusa" and "Don Quixote" sound a little different.

This album was released in French-speaking countries with a sticker linking Dana International - The Album with her Eurovision Song Contest 1998 victory - although her winning song "Diva" was in fact not included on the actual album.

There has also been a pirated bootleg version of this album in Israel, adding the English version of "Diva" as the opening track.

Dana International - The Album includes songs sung in five languages; Hebrew, Arabic, English, French and Italian.

Track listing
Note: on the actual album sleeve only the titles and "remix" (if applicable) appear. The language in which the songs are sung and the English translations of the song titles are given here for informational purposes only.

"Cinque Milla" (Italian/English; "Five Thousand") (1998 remix) - 3:26
"Maganona" (Arabic; "Crazy") (Remix) - 3:40
"Qu'est-Ce Que C'est?" (French; "What Is It?") (Ti.Pi.Cal Remix 2) - 6:02
"Power" (English) (Radio Mix) - 4:04
"I'm Gonna Let" (English) - 5:22
"Dana International" (Arabic) (Remix Edit) - 3:24
"Good Night, Europe" (English version, original Hebrew title "Layla Tov, Eropa") - 2:57
"'Arusa" (Arabic; "Bride") - 3:33
"Don Quixote" (Hebrew) - 4:05
"Going to Petra (Nosa'At Le-Petra)" (Hebrew) - 3:40
"Cinque Milla" (Italian/English; "Five Thousand") (Original Mix) - 4:56
"Maganona" (Arabic; "Crazy") (Original Mix) - 3:47
"Qu'est-Ce Que C'est?" (French; "What Is It?") (Original Mix) - 4:15

External links
 Official Dana International site with discography details
 Unofficial Dana International site with discography details
 Rateyourmusic.com discography
 Discogs.com discography

Dana International albums
1998 greatest hits albums